U.Z.Z.U. is a Bulgarian punk rock band. Formed in 1988 and featuring a female lead singer, which is rare for the genre, the group is known as one of the pioneers among Bulgarian punk outfits. The band gained popularity after successful stage performances in the early 1990s and were noticed by renowned British disc jockey John Peel, who played their tapes on BBC Radio. After being featured in two various artists compilations in the late 1990s, in 2000 U.Z.Z.U released their own album, titled "There Is No Future" (Няма Бъдеще; Nyama Budeshte), comprising the band's recordings from 1988 to 1991.

Discography
Greetings From Bulgaria (1997)
Bulgarian Archives 1983-1990 (1999)
Nyama Budeshte 1988-1991 (2001)

References

Musical groups established in 1988
Bulgarian punk rock groups